Stegastes apicalis, commonly known as the Australian gregory or yellowtip gregory, is a damselfish of the family Pomacentridae. It is native to the Western Pacific where it occurs on the east coast of Australia, the Great Barrier Reef, Queensland and New South Wales. It has also been reported from Taiwan and Ouvéa Island in the Loyalty Islands.

References

apicalis
Fish described in 1885